At Home with the Hardys was a radio programme that aired from March 1987 to June 1990.

There were 18 half-hour episodes and it was broadcast on BBC Radio 4. It starred Jeremy Hardy, Kit Hollerbach and Paul B. Davies.

Series 4 was produced and directed by David Tyler.

Notes and references

BBC Radio 4 programmes